Bettenhausen may refer to:

Places

Germany
Bettenhausen, Baden-Württemberg, in the Rottweil district, Baden-Württemberg
Bettenhausen, Kassel, a district of the city Kassel, Hesse
Bettenhausen, Lich, in the Lich district, Hesse
Bettenhausen, Rhineland-Palatinate, in the Kusel district, Rhineland-Palatinate
Bettenhausen, Thuringia, in the Schmalkalden-Meiningen district, Thuringia

Switzerland
Bettenhausen, Switzerland, in the Canton of Bern

People
Gary Bettenhausen (1941–2014), American auto racing driver
Merle Bettenhausen (born 1943), American race car driver
Tony Bettenhausen (1916–1961), American racing driver
Tony Bettenhausen Jr. (1951–2000),  American race car owner and driver

See also
 HVM Racing#Bettenhausen Motorsports
 1963 Tony Bettenhausen 200, the seventh round of the 1963 USAC Championship Car season